Feira Nova is a city in northeastern Brazil, in the State of Pernambuco. According with IBGE, has an estimated population of 22,247 inhabitants (2020).

Geography

 State - Pernambuco
 Region - Agreste Pernambucano
 Boundaries - Limoeiro  (N); Glória do Goitá  (S);  Passira  (W);  Lagoa do Itaenga  (E)
 Area - 107.75 km2
 Elevation - 154 m
 Hydrography - Capibaribe river
 Vegetation - Caducifólia forest
 Climate - tropical hot and humid
 Distance to Recife - 78 km

Economy

The main economic activities in Feira Nova are based in agribusiness, especially manioc, sugarcane and cattle and their milk.

Economic Indicators

Economy by Sector
2006

Health Indicators

References

Municipalities in Pernambuco